Three Hungarian Folksongs, Sz. 66, BB 80b is a collection of folksongs for piano by Hungarian composer Béla Bartók. It was composed between 1914 and 1918.

Composition 

There is much speculation about when the set was composed, but some of the most reliable sources point to it being composed somewhere between 1914 and 1918, in a period where Bartók felt very fascinated with folk music from Romania and his native Hungary. Many of the small compositions he wrote when collecting folk music all around these countries was either lost or revamped into later works, and some would never see the light of publication.

This set was presumably revised three decades later, between 1941 and 1942. After moving to the United States, Bartók lived in near-poverty, due to the lack of money his music could make him. However, one of his main sources of income was to publish old manuscripts. The set was published by Boosey & Hawkes in 1942.

Structure 

The set consists of three short folk tunes. It has a duration of 4 minutes, each movement lasting for about 1 minute. The movement list is as follows:

This composition was also presumably arranged for recorder and piano by Bartók himself.

See also 
 List of solo piano compositions by Béla Bartók

References 

1914 compositions
Compositions for solo piano
Compositions by Béla Bartók